Rachel Barker may refer to:

 Rachel Barker, fictional character in HolbyBlue, played by Sara Powell
 Rachel Barker, Miss New Hampshire 2007